Karina Kuregian (born 5 March 1974) is an Armenian former professional tennis player. She was a mixed-doubles silver medalist for Armenia at the 1993 Summer Universiade (with Sargis Sargsian).

Kuregian competed on the professional tour during the early 1990s and reached a career best singles ranking of 420 in the world. As a doubles player, she was ranked as high as 198 and won seven titles on the ITF Women's Circuit, including a $25k tournament in Sofia in 1992.

Between 1993 and 1996, she played collegiate tennis for Kansas State. In 1994, she became the first player from Kansas States to earn ITA All-American honors, and in 1995 she partnered with Martine Shrubsole to claim the Big Eight Conference No. 1 Doubles Championship.

ITF finals

Singles (0–1)

Doubles (7–2)

References

External links
 

1974 births
Living people
Soviet female tennis players
Armenian female tennis players
Kansas State Wildcats athletes
College women's tennis players in the United States
Universiade medalists in tennis
Universiade silver medalists for Armenia
Soviet Armenians
Medalists at the 1993 Summer Universiade